Rare Form! is a live album by George Shearing and his quintet, recorded in San Francisco in July 1963. It was released in 1966.

Reception

Scott Yanow reviewed the album for Allmusic and wrote that Shearing and his quintet "...are heard on a variety of spirited live performances throughout this LP".

Track listing 
 "The Sweetest Sounds" (Richard Rodgers) - 2:48
 "Look No Further" (Rodgers) - 2:03
 "Hallucinations" (Bud Powell) - 3:53
 "Sunny" (George Shearing, Milt Raskin) - 3:01
 "They All Laughed" (George Gershwin, Ira Gershwin) - 2:44
 "Station Break" (Shearing) - 2:51
 "Over the Rainbow" (E.Y. Harburg, Harold Arlen) - 2:26
 "Why Not?" (Doug Marsh) - 3:29
 "I'll Never Smile Again" (Ruth Lowe) - 3:10
 "Bop, Look and Listen" (Shearing) - 8:36

Personnel 
George Shearing - piano, arranger
Armando Peraza - percussion
Gary Burton - vibraphone
Ron Anthony - guitar
Gene Cherico - double bass
Vernel Fournier - drums
Reice Hamel - Recording Engineer

References

1963 live albums
George Shearing live albums
Capitol Records live albums